Khirbet El-Knese, El-Knese or El Knese are two Roman temples south of Yanta, north of Rashaya in the Rashaya District of the Beqaa Governorate in Lebanon.

Data

The upper and lower temples are included in a group of Temples of Mount Hermon. The lower temple faces east with the peak of Mount Hermon to the south. George F. Taylor described it as an Antae temple with moulded architraves to the right of the south antae.

El Knese has supposed connections to the word "ecclesia".

The ruins are in dire conditions, with only a wall remaining in relative good shape

See also

 Temples of Mount Hermon

References

External links
Photos of Roman temples in the Rashaya area on the American University of Beirut website
Roman Temples on discoverlebanon.com

Rashaya District
Archaeological sites in Lebanon
Ancient Roman temples
Roman sites in Lebanon
Tourist attractions in Lebanon